"Attracting Flies" is a song from the English electronic music duo AlunaGeorge. The track was released in the United Kingdom on 8 March 2013 as the third single from their first studio album, Body Music (2013). The song peaked at number 17 on the UK Singles Chart.

Critical reception
The track was met with universal acclaim upon its release. Pitchfork labeled it "Best New Track".

Music video
A music video to accompany the release of "Attracting Flies" was first released onto YouTube on 10 March 2013 at a total length of three minutes and twenty-seven seconds. The video is a play on the song's chorus' line "Little grey fairytales and little white lies". It features Aluna as the protagonists of various well-known fairytales, however each of them have been given a gritty, urban twist. For example, Little Red Riding Hood is being stalked late at night by a man (played by George) and his dog, and Sleeping Beauty passes out after overdosing on anti-depressants.

Track listing

Chart performance
For the chart week 23 March 2013, "Attracting Flies" debuted at number one-hundred-and-thirty-one on the UK Singles Chart. The following week saw the track rise twenty-two places to number one-hundred-and-nine. On the chart week dated 6 April 2013, the track advanced thirty-fives places to number eighty-four; becoming AlunaGeorge's third top 100 hit after "Your Drums, Your Love" (number 50, 2012) and "White Noise" (number 2, 2013). On its fourth charting week, the track rose a further thirty-three places to number fifty-one, before reaching a new peak of number thirty the following week. The following week after that, it reached number 19.

Charts

Weekly charts

Year-end charts

Certifications

Release history

References

2013 singles
2013 songs
AlunaGeorge songs
Island Records singles